The 2008–09 Bowling Green Falcons men's basketball team was the 93rd collegiate basketball team fielded by Bowling Green State University and played their home games at Anderson Arena on the BGSU campus.  The team looked to improve on their record after finishing 13–17 (7–9 MAC) placing 5th in the East Division (9th overall) and falling to rival Toledo in the MAC Tournament first round in coach Louis Orr's first season as head coach.

Coaching staff

Preseason

Recruiting

Roster

Schedule

|-
!colspan=9 style=| Exhibition

|-
!colspan=9 style=| Regular season

|-
!colspan=9 style=| MAC tournament

|-
!colspan=9 style=| NIT

References

Bowling Green
Bowling Green
Bowling Green Falcons men's basketball seasons